"Cold, Cold Heart" is a song by Hank Williams.

Cold, Cold Heart(s) may also refer to:

"Cold Cold Heart" (Wet Wet Wet song)
Cold Cold Heart (band), an American alternative country band
Cold, Cold Heart (band), a British post rock band
Cold Cold Hearts, an American punk band
Cold Cold Hearts (album), an album by the band
Cold Cold Heart (documentary film), the original title of a British television documentary series that aired as The Trap
Cold Cold Heart, the DLC title for the 2013 videogame Batman: Arkham Origins
A famous phrase in songs by Elton John: "Sacrifice" (1989) and "Cold Heart" (2021)
"Cold, Cold Heart", a song by the Mighty Lemon Drops from Sound ... Goodbye to Your Standards

See also
 Cold Heart (disambiguation)